The National Accreditation Board (NAB) of Ghana is the Government of Ghana agency responsible for the regulation, supervision and accreditation of tertiary institutions in Ghana. It is an agency under the Ministry of Education.

Establishments
The board was formed in 1993. Its formation was promoted by the 1991 Government white paper on Reforms to the Tertiary Education System of Ghana. The recommendation stated that the Board be formed to: 
contribute to the furtherance of better management of tertiary education
serve as the Quality Assurance body at the tertiary education level.

Accredited Public and Private Institutions

Public Universities
University of Ghana
Kwame Nkrumah University of Science and Technology (KNUST)
University of Cape Coast
University of Education, Winneba
University for Development Studies
University of Energy and Natural Resources
University of Health and Allied Sciences
Ghana Institute of Management and Public Administration, GIMPA
University of Mines and Technology
University of Professional Studies (UPSA)

Private Universities

Accra Institute of Technology 
Advanced Business College
African University College of Communication
All Nations University College
Almond Institute
Anglican University College of Technology
Ashesi University College
BlueCrest College  
Catholic Institute of Business and Technology
Catholic University College of Ghana
College of Science, Arts and Education
Central University
Christ Apostolic University College
Christian Service University College
Community College
Data Link Institute
Dominion University College
Ensign College of Public Health
Entrepreneurship Training Institute
Regional Maritime University
Evangelical Presbyterian University College
Fountainhead Christian College
Garden City University College
Ghana Baptist University College
Ghana Christian University College
Bmfi university college
Ghana Technology University College
 Heritage Christian University College (HCUC)
Good News Theological Seminary
Institute of Business Management and Journalism
Institute of Development and Technology Management
Islamic University College
Jayee University College
Joyce Ababio College of Creative Design
KAAF University College
Kings University College
Knutsford College
Lancaster University, Ghana Campus
Laweh Open University College
Maranatha University College
Marshalls College
Meridian University College
Methodist University College
Millar Institute For Transdisciplinary and Development Studies
Mountcrest University College
Pan African Christian University College
Pentecost University College
Presbyterian University College
Radford University College
Regent University College of Science and Technology
S S Peter and Paul Pastoral and Social Institute
Spiritan University College
St. Nicholas Seminary
St. Margaret College
University College of Agriculture and Environmental Studies
University College of Management Studies
University of Applied Management
Webster University
Akim State College (University College)
West End University College
Wisconsin International University College, Ghana
Yeshua Institute of Technology
Zenith University College
Valley View University

External links
 National Accreditation Board (NAB)

References

Ministries and Agencies of State of Ghana